Falak is the giant serpent mentioned in the One Thousand and One Nights. He resides below Bahamut, the giant fish, which carries along with a bull and an angel, the rest of the universe including six hells, the earths and the heavens. Falak itself resides in the seventh hell below everything else and it is said to be so powerful that only its fear of the greater power of God prevents it from swallowing all the creation above.

See also 
 Leviathan
 Surtr

References

Arabian legendary creatures
Legendary serpents
Jahannam
One Thousand and One Nights